Okezie Alozie (born November 29, 1993) was an American football player for the University of Buffalo.

High school career
Alozie attended Freedom High School where he rushed for over 1,000 yards and 21 TD’s as a senior for the Patriots. As a track sprinter he ran the 100 meters in 10.9h seconds and was on the 4x100 relay team.

College career
In 2015, Alozie finished with 85 tackles, 10.5 tackles for loss, 5 sacks, 2 interceptions(1 for TD), 2 forced fumbles, 9 passes defended, and 1 fumble recovery. He was named an Honorable Mention All-American by ProFootballFocus and an All-MAC selection by both the league's coaches   and Phil Steele.

References

1993 births
Living people
Players of American football from Shreveport, Louisiana
Sportspeople from Bethlehem, Pennsylvania
American football defensive backs
Buffalo Bulls football players